
This is a list of AEW Dark: Elevation episodes including episode number, location, venue and that night's main event.

All dates, venues and main events are per the official AEW YouTube channel.

2021

2022

2023

See also 

 List of AEW Dynamite episodes
 List of AEW Rampage episodes
 List of AEW Dark episodes

References 

All Elite Wrestling lists
Lists of American non-fiction television series episodes